Cocoa Brown is a 2016 Ghanaian TV series produced by Deloris Frimpong Manso, written by Gene Adu and directed by Kofi Asamoah.
The TV series was aired on Viast 1 before it was taken to GH One.

Synopsis
The television series tells a story of Cocoa Brown a radio personality and challenges she face to rise as a superstar.

Cast
 Ahuofe Patricia
 Eunice Banini
 Akorfa Edjeani
 Caroline Sampson
 Black Boy
 Root Eye
 Shatta Michy

References

Ghanaian television series
2016 Ghanaian television series debuts
GHOne TV original programming